Christopher Ferguson (16 July 1907 – 11 June 1981)  was a Scottish professional footballer who played as an inside forward. He made appearances in the English Football League for Chelsea, Queens Park Rangers and Wrexham.

References

1907 births
1981 deaths
Scottish footballers
Association football forwards
Chelsea F.C. players
Queens Park Rangers F.C. players
Wrexham A.F.C. players
Guildford City F.C. players
English Football League players